Melissa Sgambelluri (born 1983 in New York) is an American actress, dancer, and singer, most famous for her appearances on American Idol Season 6 as the "fountain girl".  She was raised in the Capital District and now lives in New York City. Melissa has appeared on Saturday Night Live and worked on an EP.

Early career
Sgambelluri acted in local theater in Albany's Washington Park, and was a runner-up for the Albany Tulip Queen beauty contest.  She attended Bishop Maginn High School and the College of Saint Rose in Albany, New York. She was the opening act for American Idol Season 4 runner-up Bo Bice, and sang locally at other gigs in the Capital District of New York, while also working as a receptionist at a hair stylist's boutique.

Sgambelluri appeared in the first few minutes of the "Best of the Rest" episode of American Idol Season 6, where she sang Christina Aguilera's Ain't No Other Man and Ira Gershwin's Someone to Watch Over Me.  She also appeared in the opening credits and a promo that season jumping up and down in a fountain in Memphis with her "Golden Ticket" to Hollywood, but was contractually required to keep her final status a secret.

Sgambelluri was eliminated from the competition in the Hollywood rounds.  She did, however, make it into the Idol Final 100, received kudos from Paula Abdul and Randy Jackson, was feted in Albany, and was able to perform in Hollywood.

Subsequent career
Sgambelluri has recorded a video at Quad Studios in New York City, which is now shown at YouTube and other viral video web sites. Since mid-2007, she has performed as an R & B singer around the Capital District, as well as the New York City area.  She lives in New York City and is co-lead singer for the Connecticut pop cover band, So What?.

References

External links
 Bio on So What? band website
 Sample songs from a fan page
 Sample videos from the "Sgambelluri video compilation" on a Japanese web site
 Sample videos from the FlashGameSite fan site
 Sample videos from the Fresh News Indian web site
 Sample videos on YouTube

1983 births
Living people
American Idol participants
Actors from Albany, New York
College of Saint Rose alumni
21st-century American women singers
21st-century American singers
Musicians from Albany, New York